Nikolo-Alexandrovka is a rural locality (a selo) and the administrative center of Nikolo-Alexandrovsky Selsoviet of Oktyabrsky District, Amur Oblast, Russia. The population was 503 as of 2018. There are 7 streets.

Geography 
Nikolo-Alexandrovka is located 56 km southwest of Yekaterinoslavka (the district's administrative centre) by road. Pokrovka is the nearest rural locality.

References 

Rural localities in Oktyabrsky District, Amur Oblast